Obsession is a Filipino medical drama series broadcast by TV5 starring Bianca King, Neri Naig, Martin Escudero and Marvin Agustin. which was aired from January 23, 2014 to April 10, 2014, replacing For Love or Money.

Synopsis
Bernadette (Neri Naig) falls in love with James (Martin Escudero), but he never loved her. Her obsession to James turned her to Ramon (Marvin Agustin), a doctor similarly obsessed to a woman named Vanessa (Bianca King). He agreed to change her face according to her desire; unknown to her, the doctor fell madly in love with her that indulged them in dark tendencies.

Cast
Bianca King as Vanessa Villareal / Bernadette Cabrera
Neri Naig as Bernadette Cabrera
Martin Escudero as James Calderon
Marvin Agustin as Ramon Mendoza
Elizabeth Oropesa as Regina Mendoza
Maureen Mauricio as Eliza Villareal
Richard Quan as Jaime Calderon
Shiela Marie Rodriguez as Irene Calderon
Kerbie Zamora as Timothy Cabrera
Franchesca Salcedo as Lucy Calderon

See also
List of programs aired by TV5 (Philippine TV network)

References

External links
 

Philippine drama television series
Philippine melodrama television series
Philippine thriller television series
2014 Philippine television series debuts
2014 Philippine television series endings
TV5 (Philippine TV network) drama series
Philippine medical television series
Psychological thriller television series
Filipino-language television shows